Mod is a 2011 Hindi romantic drama film directed by Nagesh Kukunoor. The film stars Ayesha Takia and Rannvijay Singh, Raghubir Yadav, Tanvi Azmi and Anant Mahadevan. The film was released on 14 October 2011. The film is a remake of 2007 Taiwanese film ′′Keeping Watch′′

Plot
 
A 25-year-old woman named Ananya  lives in a beautiful hill station called Ganga in Southern India's Nilgiris district, with her father, Ashok Mahadeo, and aunt, Gayatri Garg. Ashok is the head of the local Kishore Kumar fan club while Gayatri runs a restaurant. Ananya's mother left home years ago to pursue her dreams. Ashok still waits for her to return. A local shopkeeper, Gangaram, who they owe money to, has feelings for Ananya.

In order to support herself and her father, Ananya runs a watch repair store where she meets a stranger named Andy. He comes everyday to get his water-logged watch repaired and leaves a 100 note in the form of an Origami swan. Andy claims to be her classmate from school and admits that he had a crush on her and had agreed to wait for 10 years to see her. She takes a liking to him and both hang out together while she attempts to deal with her creditor, Gangaram, and increasing pressure from R.K. Constructions who want to build a resort in the area. Eventually, Ananya and Andy fall in love. However, Ananya's world shatters when she finds out that the real Andy died several years ago, and the man claiming to be him is actually an inmate at the local mental institute. The rest of the film traces the truth about the man impersonating Andy, and Ananya's tribulations.

Cast
 Ayesha Takia as Ananya Mahadeo
 Rannvijay Singh as Andy/Abhay
 Raghubir Yadav as Ashok Mahadeo
 Tanvi Azmi as Gayatri Garg
 Anant Mahadevan as Dr. Reddy
 Gulfam Khan as Nurse Kutty
 Prateeksha Lonkar as Mrs. Raymond
 Nakul Sahdev as young Andrew Raymond

Music
The music for the film was composed by Tapas Relia.

Reception
Taran Adarsh of  Bollywood Hungama gave the film 2 out of 5, writing ″Ayesha Takia Azmi sparkles yet again in MOD. A truly wonderful performance! Contrary to his image, Rannvijay is cast as a sweet, quirky, sensitive, geeky guy here. And not just the character, but also his performance takes you by surprise. He nails it right this time. Raghubir Yadav is, as always, dependable. Tanvi Azmi shines as well. Anant Mahadevan is first-rate. Rushad Rana does well. Nikhil Ratnaparkhi excels. Prateeksha Lonkar appears in a cameo. On the whole, MOD appeals in bits and spurts. That's about it!″ A. Ganesh Nadar of Rediff.com gave the film 2 out 5, writing ″It's a lovely story with great actors, and great scenery. What screws it up is the slow movement. You really have to have patience to watch the movie or be happy just to watch Ayesha. Wish director Nagesh Kukunoor had someone to tell him that slow and steady doesn't win races any more. You have to be fast and racy. A must-see for Ayesha fans; the rest can give it a miss.″  Aniruddha Guha of  DNA gave the film 2 out of 5, writing ″Mod doesn’t work in totality, but has its moments. What it does, really, is remind you of the fact that Kukunoor is a filmmaker you can't ignore. Shunning technical flamboyance, he continues to tell stories in the more conventional mould, some which work, some which don't. You can expect him to stun you in the future.″

Shubhra Gupta of  The Indian Express gave the film 1.5 out of 5, writing ″It's so obvious that Andy is not who he says he is that you wonder why Kukunoor takes so long to get to the point. But then, he needs to pause to show off all the nice waterfalls and the rocks and the winding roads. The scenery is fine only for a bit, but then gets overtaken by situations which you can see a mile off. You know that that Andy is disturbed much before the doctor (Mahadevan) pronounces his diagnosis. The reason for his being the way he is unspools with no surprises. Takia is her familiar wholesome-girl-next-door but has to shoulder too much of the film, and Rannvijay is one-tone.″ Komal Nahta, editor of Koimoi.com quoted "Mod will not be able to score at the ticket windows" and gave it one star.

References

External links
 

2011 films
2010s Hindi-language films
Films shot in Ooty
Films directed by Nagesh Kukunoor
Films scored by Tapas Relia
Indian remakes of foreign films